Affairs of the Heart is a British sitcom that aired on ITV from 1983 to 1985. Starring Derek Fowlds, it was written by Paul Daneman. It was made for the ITV network by Granada Television.

Cast
Derek Fowlds - Peter Bonamy
Sarah Badel - Jane Bonamy
Elizabeth Anson - Rosemary Bonamy (pilot)
Holly Aird - Rosemary Bonamy (series)

Special guests
Carol Barnes - Herself
David Suchet - Peter Bonamy's Dad
Peter Sallis - Himself
Aidan Cook - Himself
Nicholas Owen - Himself

Background
Affairs of the Heart tells the semi-autobiographical tale of Peter Bonamy who has a heart attack. The writer, Paul Daneman, had suffered a heart attack while performing in the West End, and by chance he had been portraying a man suffering from a heart attack. During Daneman's recovery he had to delay acting again, and so took up writing. Affairs of the Heart was the result.

Plot
After Peter Bonamy suffers a heart attack, and subsequently leaves hospital, he leads his life more carefully than before. His wife Jane and daughter Rosemary molly-coddle him, and he also attends a heart-attack survivors group. Bonamy, from the comfort of his south London home, finds himself doing little, especially as he can not even drive his Porsche.

Unusually for a television sitcom, there was no audience at the recordings.

Episodes

Pilot (1983)
Pilot (23 August 1983)

Series One (1985)
Episode One (22 July 1985)
Episode Two (29 July 1985)
Episode Three (5 August 1985)
Episode Four (12 August 1985)
Episode Five (19 August 1985)
Episode Six (26 August 1985)

References
Mark Lewisohn, "Radio Times Guide to TV Comedy", BBC Worldwide Ltd, 2003
Affairs of the Heart at British TV Comedy

External links

1983 British television series debuts
1985 British television series endings
1980s British sitcoms
ITV sitcoms
Television series by ITV Studios
Television shows produced by Granada Television
English-language television shows